Baibars al-Jashankir (died 1310) or Baibars II, royal name al-Malik al-Muzaffar Rukn ad-Din Baibars aj-Jashankir al-Mansuri, also known as Abu al-Fath, was the 12th Mamluk sultan of Mamluk Egypt in 1309–1310.

Background

He was a Circassian Mamluk of Sultan Qalawun and served at the court of Qalawun's Sons Al-Ashraf Khalil and Al-Nasir Muhammad. He became an Emir (a prince) then a Jashnakir. During the second reign of Sultan Al-Nasir Mohammed from 1299 to 1309 he was the Vice-Sultan of Egypt. In 1302 he took part in suppressing a rebellion in upper Egypt and in 1303 he was a commander in the Egyptian army that defeated the Mongols led by Qutlugh-Shah at the Battle of Shaqhab.

In 1302, the Mamluk army of Sultan al-Nasir Muhammad crushed a Bedouin rebellion in Upper Egypt and "slew mercilessly every Bedouin in the land and carried off their women captive". G. W. Murray said that "This drastic solution of the Bedouin question removed the pure Arab descendants of the Conquerors from the scene and so enabled the Beja to preserve themselves as an African race practically uninfluenced by Arab blood, while leaving the desert edges of Upper Egypt free for settlement by the Western Bedouin." The army was led by the Oirat Mongol Mamluk Sayf al-Din Salar and Circassian Mamluk al-Baibars al-Jashnakir (Beibars).

Etymology of the name

The monarch's name was a combination of Turkic, Persian and Arabic terms. The given name Baibars was a Turco-Mongolian name, meaning "Chosen by the chief/lord". The title of al-Malike al-Muzaffar was an Arabic honorific title that meant "the victorious king", and the title Rukn ad-Din was an Arabic honorific title meaning the "pillar of faith". The second portion, "Jashangir", is Persian, meaning "Food connoisseur": the mamluk prince who tastes the Sultan's food to make sure it is not poisoned.

Rise to power and fall

With Emir Sayf al-Din Salar he dominated the young Sultan al-Nasir Muhammad who, feeling distressed, moved to Al Karak and resigned in 1309. Baibars al-Jashnakir became a Sultan after the position was imposed on him by Emir Sayf al-Din Salar and the Burji Mamluks.

The brief period of his reign (ten months and 24 days) was marked by economical and political unrest in addition to threats from Crusaders and Mongols. The Crusaders who had allied with the Mongol Empire continued to harass Mamluk outposts in the Levant. The poverty-stricken commons kept rampaging the streets of Cairo, calling him Rakin (useless) instead of Rukn (principal) demanding the return of Sultan al-Nasir Muhammad to Egypt. In 1310 Baibars al-Jashnakir stepped down and fled with his Mamluks from the angry mob. Sultan al-Nasir Muhammad returned to Egypt and Baibars al-Jashnakir was arrested and executed on his orders.

References

Sources

Al-Maqrizi, Al Selouk Leme'refatt Dewall al-Melouk, Dar al-kotob, 1997. In English: Bohn, Henry G., The Road to Knowledge of the Return of Kings, Chronicles of the Crusades, AMS Press, 1969.
Ibn Taghri, al-Nujum al-Zahirah Fi Milook Misr wa al-Qahirah, al-Hay'ah al-Misreyah 1968
Mahdi, Dr. Shafik, Mamalik Misr wa Alsham ( Mamluks of Egypt and the Levant), Aldar Alarabiya, Beirut 2008
Sadawi. H, Al-Mamalik, Maruf Ikhwan, Alexandria.

External links
Qur'an manuscript commissioned by Baibars II: zoomable images, information, audio
Complex of Baibars al-Jashnakir
Coins of Baibars al-Jashnakir

Bahri sultans
1310 deaths
Year of birth unknown
14th-century Mamluk sultans
Regents of Egypt
Circassian Mamluks
13th-century Egyptian people